Kühnel is a surname. Notable people with the surname include:

August Kühnel (1645–c. 1700), German composer and viola da gamba performer
Ernst Kühnel (1882−1964), German art historian
Kea Kühnel (born 1991), German freestyle skier 
Mariana Harder-Kühnel (born 1974), German politician
Rudolf Kühnel (1896–1950), Austrian racewalker